Reformed Protestant Dutch Church of Klyne Esopus, now known as Klyne Esopus Historical Society Museum, is a historic Dutch Reformed church building at 764 US 9W in Esopus, Ulster County, New York.

The church building was constructed in 1827. In 1965 the Ulster Park Reformed Church closed the church after 138 years of operation. In the late 1960s, local preservationists thwarted efforts to raze to the building, and it became a museum of the Klyne Esopus Historical Society.

The church was added to the National Register of Historic Places in 2002.

References

External links
Klyne Esopus Historical Society Museum

Churches on the National Register of Historic Places in New York (state)
History museums in New York (state)
Museums in Ulster County, New York
Reformed Church in America churches in New York (state)
Former Dutch Reformed churches in New York (state)
Historical society museums in New York (state)
Churches in Ulster County, New York
National Register of Historic Places in Ulster County, New York